Conus maioensis is a species of sea snail, a marine gastropod mollusk in the family Conidae, the cone snails and their allies.

Like all species within the genus Conus, these snails are predatory and venomous. They are capable of "stinging" humans, therefore live ones should be handled carefully or not at all.

Description
The size of the shell varies between 15 mm and 40 mm.

Distribution
This species occurs in the Eastern Atlantic Ocean, along the northern coast of the island of Maio, Cape Verde. Its conservation status is least concern.

References

 Trovão, H., Rolán, E. and Félix-Alves, I. A. V. 1990. A new species of Conus from the Cabo Verde Archipelago, West Africa (Mollusca: Gastropoda: Conidae). Publicações Ocasionais da Sociedade Portuguesa de Malacologia 15: 69–78, 11 figs.
  Puillandre N., Duda T.F., Meyer C., Olivera B.M. & Bouchet P. (2015). One, four or 100 genera? A new classification of the cone snails. Journal of Molluscan Studies. 81: 1–23

External links
 The Conus Biodiversity website
 Cone Shells - Knights of the Sea
 

maioensis
Gastropods of Cape Verde
Fauna of Maio, Cape Verde
Endemic fauna of Cape Verde
Gastropods described in 1990